The Secretary of Treasury of Puerto Rico (commonly known as the Treasurer of Puerto Rico) is the chief financial officer and the treasurer of the government of Puerto Rico.

Secretaries
The following is a list of officeholders:

1917–1922: José E. Benedicto
1922–1923: Ramón Aboy
1923–1924: J.W. Bonner
1924–1929: Juan G. Gallardo
1930–1935: Manuel V. Domenech
1935–1940: Rafael Sancho Bonet
1941–1948: Rafael Buscaglia
1949–1955: Sol Luis Descartes
1955–1958: Rafael Picó
1958–1963: José R. Nogueras
1964–1968: Jorge Font Saldaña
1969–1970: Ángel M. Rivera
1970–1971: Angel Martín Taboas
1971–1972: Wallace González Oliver
1972–1973: Raymond J. González
1973–1976: Salvador E. Casellas
1976–1981: Julio César Pérez
1981–1984: Carmen Ana Culpeper
1985–1989: Juan Agosto Alicea
1989–1992: Ramón García Santiago
1992–1993: Ángel Rivera
1993–1997: Manuel Díaz Saldaña
1997–2000: Xenia Vélez Silva
2001–2004: Juan A. Flores Galarza
2005–2007: Juan C. Méndez Torres
2008–2008: José G. Dávila Matos
2008–2008: Ángel A. Ortiz García
2009–2010: Juan Carlos Puig
2010–2012: Jesús F. Méndez
2012–2012: Blanca Álvarez
2013–2014: Melba Acosta Febo
2014–2017: Juan Zaragoza
2017–2019: Raúl Maldonado
2019–present: Francisco Parés Alicea

References

Council of Secretaries of Puerto Rico
 
Tresurer